United States of America v. Islamic Republic of Iran [1980] ICJ 1 (also called the Case Concerning United States Diplomatic and Consular Staff in Tehran) is a public international law case (issued in two decisions) brought to the International Court of Justice by the United States of America against Iran in response to the Iran hostage crisis, where United States diplomatic offices and personnel were seized by militant revolutionaries.

Facts
On 4 November 1979 there was an armed attack by Iranian students on the United States Embassy in Tehran and they overtook it. The students, belonging to the Muslim Student Followers of the Imam's Line, did this as an act of support to the Iranian Revolution. More than sixty American diplomats and citizens were held hostage for 444 days (until January 20, 1981). Some of the hostages were released earlier, but 52 hostages were held hostage until the end. Although Iran had promised protection to the U.S. Embassy, the guards disappeared during the takeover and the government of Iran did not attempt to stop it or rescue the hostages. The U.S. arranged to meet with Iranian authorities to discuss the release of the hostages, but Ayatollah Khomeini (the leader of the Iranian Revolution) forbade officials to meet them. The U.S. ceased relations with Iran, stopped U.S. exports, oil imports, and Iranian assets were blocked.

Judgments
The first decision was an Order of Provisional Measures, issued December 15, 1979. This was the court issuing an opinion not on the merits underlying the case specifically, but rather ordering preservation of the respective rights and obligations the two countries owed one another pending the final decision of the court. More specifically, the Court unanimously declared Iran should ensure the restoration of the U.S. embassy in Tehran to U.S. possession, release the hostages, and afford diplomatic officials full protections as afforded by the Vienna Convention on Diplomatic Relations.

The second decision addressed the actual merits of Iran's actions. Iran took no part in the proceedings.

The case was the first real instance of the Court and the Security Council acting together to bring a crisis to an end.

The ICJ considered the case in hand in two phases. The first phase referred to the armed attack on the US Embassy in Tehran by militants and students of Iran. The question asked was whether the militants and the students were 'agents' of the Iranian Government and therefore, acting on their behalf. The second phase comprises the whole series of facts which occurred following the completion of the occupation of the US Embassy by militants and the seizure of the Consulates.

The Court reached a judgement on 24 May 1980.

For the first question, the ICJ found the militants and students to be 'agents' of the Iranian Government, because the latter had approved and perpetuated their actions, translating occupation of the embassy and detention of the hostages into official acts of the state, of which the perpetrators, while initially acting in private capacities, were rendered agents of the Iranian state.

Notes

External links
 International Court of Justice, United States Diplomatic and Consular Staff in Tehran (United States of America v. Iran)proceedings, judgement, and two dissenting opinions

International Court of Justice cases
Iran–United States relations
Iran hostage crisis
1980 in the United States
1980 in Iran
1980 in international relations
1980 in case law